National symbols of Kosovo are the symbols that are used in Kosovo to represent what is unique about the nation, reflecting different aspects of its cultural life and history.

Official symbols

Unofficial symbols

References

 
Kosovan culture